Bobby Moffat is an English retired footballer who played eight seasons with the Dallas Tornado of the North American Soccer League.

Moffat began his career with Portsmouth before moving to Gillingham in 1965. He made only twenty-four appearances with the first team before moving to Margate in July 1968. In December 1968, Margate sold Moffat's contract to Chelmsford City for £800. In 1970, he moved to the Dallas Tornado of the North American Soccer League where he finished his career. However, he did return to England for three loan spells during the early 1970s. In 1983, he was the vice president of the Dallas Americans of the American Soccer League.

Moffat continues to live in Dallas, where he coaches youth soccer.

References

External links
 NASL stats
 Career statistics

1945 births
Living people
Footballers from Portsmouth
Association football midfielders
English footballers
Portsmouth F.C. players
Gillingham F.C. players
Margate F.C. players
Chelmsford City F.C. players
Dallas Tornado players
Yeovil Town F.C. players
Weymouth F.C. players
Waterlooville F.C. players
English Football League players
North American Soccer League (1968–1984) indoor players
North American Soccer League (1968–1984) players
English expatriate footballers
English expatriate sportspeople in the United States
Expatriate soccer players in the United States